Philippe Joseph Henri Lemaire (9 January 1798, Valenciennes - 2 August 1880, Paris)  was a French sculptor, working in a neoclassical academic style.

Life and career
He was a pupil of Pierre Cartellier, and won the Prix de Rome for sculpture in 1821.
 
Lemaire sculpted the high relief of the Last Judgment for the pediment of the Église de la Madeleine, Paris. He is among the major academic sculptors of France who are represented in the sculpture of the Arc de Triomphe, Paris: the others are Jean-Pierre Cortot, François Rude, Antoine Étex, and James Pradier.

His bronze monument for the city of Quimper, commemorating the Breton Napoleonic hero and antiquarian, Théophile Corret de la Tour d'Auvergne, was melted down during World War II.

Selected works

References

 Thieme-Becker, 1929, s.v. "Lemaire".

External links

1798 births
1880 deaths
People from Valenciennes
Politicians from Hauts-de-France
Bonapartists
Members of the 1st Corps législatif of the Second French Empire
Members of the 2nd Corps législatif of the Second French Empire
French architectural sculptors
19th-century French sculptors
French male sculptors
Prix de Rome for sculpture
Members of the Académie des beaux-arts
Officiers of the Légion d'honneur